The 2017 KPMG Women's PGA Championship was the 63rd Women's PGA Championship, played June 29 – July 2 at Olympia Fields Country Club in Olympia Fields, Illinois, a suburb south of Chicago. Known as the LPGA Championship through 2014, it was the second of five major championships on the LPGA Tour during the 2017 season.

Danielle Kang won the championship for her first professional win, one stroke ahead of defending champion Brooke Henderson.

Olympia Fields hosted the PGA Championship in 1925 and 1961, and the U.S. Open in 1928 and 2003.

Golf Channel and NBC Sports televised the Women's PGA for the third consecutive year.

Field
The field included 156 players who meet one or more of the selection criteria and commit to participate by a designated deadline.

Qualified players
Players who qualified for the Championship are listed below. Players are listed under the first category in which they qualified; additional qualifying categories are shown in parentheses. Players were eligible based on the following criteria:

1. Active LPGA Hall of Fame members

Karrie Webb (2,12)

Juli Inkster (2,12) did not play

2. Past winners of the Women's PGA Championship

Laura Davies, Shanshan Feng (4,6,12), Brooke Henderson (4,5,6,12), Cristie Kerr (4,6,10,12), Anna Nordqvist (4,5,6,10,12), Inbee Park (3,4,6,7,12), Suzann Pettersen (3,4,6,10,12), Yani Tseng

Pak Se-ri did not play

3. Professionals who have won an LPGA major championship in the previous five years and during the current year

Choi Na-yeon (4,12), Chun In-gee (4,6,12), Ariya Jutanugarn (4,5,6,12), Kim Hyo-joo (4,12), Lydia Ko (4,5,6,12), Brittany Lang (4,6,10,12), Stacy Lewis (6,10,12), Brittany Lincicome (4,10,12), Mo Martin (12), Ryu So-yeon (4,5,6,12), Jiyai Shin (6), Lexi Thompson (4,6,10,12), Michelle Wie (10,12), Yoo Sun-young (12)
 
4. Professionals who have won an official LPGA tournament in the previous two calendar years and during the current year

Chella Choi (5,12), Carlota Ciganda (6,10,12), Charley Hull (6,10,12), In-Kyung Kim (6,12), Kim Sei-young (6,12), Jessica Korda (6,12), Minjee Lee (6,12), Mirim Lee (5,6,12), Caroline Masson (10,12), Haru Nomura (6,12), Jenny Shin (12), Kris Tamulis (12), Amy Yang (5,6,12)

 Ahn Sun-ju and Jang Ha-na (12) did not play

5. Professionals who finished top-10 and ties at the previous year's Women's PGA Championship

Su-Hyun Oh (12), Park Hee-young (12)

6. Professionals ranked No. 1-30 on the Women's World Golf Rankings as of June 5, 2017

M. J. Hur (12), Park Sung-hyun (12), Gerina Piller (10,12)

Kim Ha-neul, Lee Bo-mee, and Teresa Lu did not play

7. Gold Medal winner at the 2016 Rio Olympics

8. The top eight finishers at the 2016 LPGA T&CP National Championship

Jean Bartholomew, Jessica Carafiello, Wendy Doolan, Lisa Grimes, Amanda McCurdy, Karen Paolozzi, Hillery Sence, Kristin Walla

9. The top finisher (not otherwise qualified via the 2016 LPGA T&CP National Championship) at the 2017 PGA Women's Stroke Play Championship

Alison Curdt

10. Members of the European and United States Solheim Cup teams in 2015

Paula Creamer (12), Sandra Gal (12), Caroline Hedwall (12), Karine Icher (12), Alison Lee (12), Catriona Matthew (12), Azahara Muñoz (12), Gwladys Nocera, Morgan Pressel (12), Melissa Reid (12), Lizette Salas (12), Angela Stanford (12)

11. Maximum of two sponsor invites

Georgia Hall, Klára Spilková

12. LPGA members who have committed to the event, ranked in the order of their position on the 2017 official money list through the conclusion of the Walmart NW Arkansas Championship

Marina Alex, Beth Allen, Brittany Altomare, Aditi Ashok, Laetitia Beck, Nicole Broch Larsen, Ashleigh Buhai, Katie Burnett, Dori Carter, Sandra Changkija, Pei-Yun Chien, Karen Chung, Cydney Clanton, Holly Clyburn, Jacqui Concolino, Perrine Delacour, Lindy Duncan, Austin Ernst, Jodi Ewart Shadoff, Simin Feng, Laura Gonzalez Escallon, Jaye Marie Green, Mina Harigae, Nasa Hataoka, Céline Herbin, Dani Holmqvist, Wei-Ling Hsu, Vicky Hurst, Eun-Hee Ji, Tiffany Joh, Moriya Jutanugarn, Danielle Kang, Haeji Kang, Kim Kaufman, Megan Khang, Christina Kim, Katherine Kirk, Joanna Klatten, Nelly Korda, Olafia Kristinsdottir, Candie Kung, Min Seo Kwak, Bronte Law, Ilhee Lee, Lee Jeong-eun, Lee Mi-hyang, Min Lee, Amelia Lewis, Lin Xiyu, Pernilla Lindberg, Gaby López, Lee Lopez, Ally McDonald, Stephanie Meadow, Wichanee Meechai, Ai Miyazato, Giulia Molinaro, Becky Morgan, Belen Mozo, Therese O'Hara, Amy Olson, Ryann O'Toole, Lee-Anne Pace, Brooke Pancake, Annie Park, Jane Park, Sadena Parks, Emily Kristine Pedersen, Katherine Perry, Pornanong Phatlum, Beatriz Recari, Paula Reto, Demi Runas, Madelene Sagström, Sherman Santiwiwatthanaphong, Alena Sharp, Kelly Shon, Sarah Jane Smith, Jennifer Song, Nontaya Srisawang, Marissa Steen, Jackie Stoelting, Thidapa Suwannapura, Kelly Tan, Pannarat Thanapolboonyaras, Ayako Uehara, Mariajo Uribe, Cheyenne Woods, Jing Yan, Angel Yin, Sakura Yokomine, Pavarisa Yoktuan

Maude-Aimee Leblanc and Mika Miyazato did not play

13. The remainder of the field will be filled by members who have committed to the event, ranked in the order of their position on the 2017 LPGA Priority List as of the commitment deadline

Nationalities in the field

Past champions in the field

Made the cut

Missed the cut

Round summaries

First round
Thursday, June 29, 2017
Friday, June 30, 2017

Source:

Second round
Friday, June 30, 2017

Third round
Saturday, July 1, 2017

Final round
Sunday, July 2, 2017

Source:

Scorecard
Final round

Cumulative tournament scores, relative to par

Source:

References

External links

Coverage on the LPGA Tour official site

Women's PGA Championship
Golf in Illinois
PGA Championship
Women's PGA Championship
Women's PGA Championship
Women's PGA Championship
Women's PGA Championship
Women's sports in Illinois